Hepatic ligaments may refer to:

 Coronary ligament of the liver
 Falciform ligament
 Hepatoduodenal ligament
 Hepatogastric ligament	
 Hepatophrenic ligament
 Hepatorenal ligament
 Round ligament of liver